Parliamentary elections were held in Bolivia in May 1918 to elect half the seats of the Chamber Deputies and one-third of the Senate.

Results

Elected members
The new senators were:
Juan María Zalles, PL (La Paz)
Felipe Peredo, PL (Santa Cruz)
Adolfo Trigo Achá, PL (Tarija)
Ismael Arteaga, PL (Beni)
Néstor Suárez, PL (Beni)
Clodoveo Urioste, PL (Chuquisaca)

References

Elections in Bolivia
Bolivia
Legislative election
May 1918 events
Election and referendum articles with incomplete results